The first season of the NBC comedy-drama series Parenthood premiered on March 2, 2010 and ended on May 25, 2010, it consisted of 13 episodes. Season one was released on DVD in Region 1 on August 31, 2010 and Region 4 on December 1, 2010.

Cast

Main cast
 Peter Krause as Adam Braverman (13 episodes)
 Lauren Graham as Sarah Braverman (13 episodes)
 Dax Shepard as Crosby Braverman (13 episodes)
 Monica Potter as Kristina Braverman (13 episodes)
 Erika Christensen as Julia Braverman-Graham (13 episodes)
 Sam Jaeger as Joel Graham (13 episodes)
 Savannah Paige Rae as Sydney Graham (13 episodes)
 Sarah Ramos as Haddie Braverman (13 episodes)
 Max Burkholder as Max Braverman (13 episodes)
 Joy Bryant as Jasmine Trussell (12 episodes)
 Miles Heizer as Drew Holt (12 episodes)
 Mae Whitman as Amber Holt (13 episodes)
 Bonnie Bedelia as Camille Braverman (10 episodes)
 Craig T. Nelson as Zeek Braverman (10 episodes)

Recurring cast
 Tyree Brown as Jabbar Trussell
 Erinn Hayes as Racquel
 Marguerite Moreau as Katie
 Tom Amandes as Dr. Pelikan
 Jason Ritter as Mark Cyr
 Minka Kelly as Gaby
 Asher Book as Steve Williams
 Phil Abrams as Phil Lessing
 Amanda Foreman as Suze Lessing
 Eduardo Rioseco as Damien
 Mike O'Malley as Jim Kazinsky
 Tina Lifford as Renee Trussell

Production
Parenthood was originally scheduled to premiere on NBC on September 23, 2009.  However, on July 10, 2009, it was announced that Parenthood would be pushed back to midseason,  because of actress Maura Tierney's breast cancer. Subsequently, on September 10, 2009, a spokesperson for Tierney announced that she was leaving the show due to conflicts with her treatment schedule. Tierney's already-filmed scenes were deleted. On October 9, 2009, it was announced that Lauren Graham would replace Tierney in the upcoming series. Parenthood was expected to premiere March 1, 2010, and air on Monday nights at 9:00 p.m. However, after the cancellation of The Jay Leno Show, NBC moved the premiere to March 2, 2010, at 10:00 p.m.

Episodes

Ratings

U.S. Live Ratings

References

2010 American television seasons
Season 1